Mirsad Bešlija (born 6 July 1979) is a Bosnian retired professional footballer who played as a right winger.

He has most notably played for Željezničar, Genk, Heart of Midlothian and the Bosnia and Herzegovina national team.

Club career
Bešlija started his career with hometown club Slaven Živinice. Although he was among the youngest players in their squad, he became an important part of the first team. He was spotted there and signed by Bosna Visoko, a first division team at that time, in 1997. He spent two seasons in Visoko, during which he won both the Bosnian Cup and Supercup. His rapid footballing ascent attracted the interest of Željezničar and he signed for them in 2000, becoming a fan favourite during his single season in the capital. He won three trophies in that period with Željezničar, one Bosnian Premier League title, one cup and one Supercup.

Bešlija joined Genk in July 2001, where he stayed for five years, and made over 130 league appearances, winning the Belgian First Division title with them in 2002. He moved to Scottish side Heart of Midlothian during January 2006 in a deal worth £850,000 (€1.22 million), a record fee paid by the Tynecastle side at the time. A dispute developed about whether the overall transfer fee should include agents percentages or not, leading Hearts to suspend payment after the first installment. When further dialogue brought no resolution, Genk petitioned UEFA to impose a transfer embargo upon Hearts, however, an agreement was finally reached in December 2006, with Hearts paying the entire outstanding balance.

Bešlija suffered serious injury problems at Hearts and he failed to win a regular first team place. He was loaned out to Belgian club Sint-Truidense for the 2007–08 season, and was released by Hearts in October 2008 after they reached a severance agreement.

In 2009, he re-signed with Željezničar and retired in 2012, winning four more trophies in the process, two leagues and two cups.

International career

Bešlija made his debut for Bosnia and Herzegovina in a January 2001 Sahara Millennium Cup match against Bangladesh and has earned a total of 37 caps, scoring 4 goals. His final international was a September 2006 European Championship qualification match against Hungary.

Honours
Bosna Visoko
Bosnian Cup: 1998–99
Bosnian Supercup: 1999

Željezničar 
Bosnian Premier League: 2000–01, 2009–10, 2011–12
Bosnian Cup: 2000–01, 2010–11, 2011–12 
Bosnian Supercup: 2000

Genk
Belgian First Division: 2001–02

References

External links

Hearts Appearances at londonhearts.com

1979 births
Living people
People from Živinice
Association football wingers
Bosnia and Herzegovina footballers
Bosnia and Herzegovina international footballers
NK Bosna Visoko players
FK Željezničar Sarajevo players
K.R.C. Genk players
Heart of Midlothian F.C. players
Sint-Truidense V.V. players
Premier League of Bosnia and Herzegovina players
Belgian Pro League players
Scottish Premier League players
Bosnia and Herzegovina expatriate footballers
Expatriate footballers in Belgium
Bosnia and Herzegovina expatriate sportspeople in Belgium
Expatriate footballers in Scotland
Bosnia and Herzegovina expatriate sportspeople in Scotland